Time and Trauma is the sixth studio album by American metal band 36 Crazyfists. The album was released in the UK on February 16, 2015 and on February 17, 2015 for the rest of the world. The album was included at number 42 on Rock Sounds top 50 releases of 2015 list.

Track listing

Charts

References
Citations

Sources

 

2015 albums
36 Crazyfists albums
Spinefarm Records albums